This is a list of top-division association football clubs in CAF countries. CAF, the African football confederation, includes all African countries as members.

The French Overseas Department of Réunion and the autonomous island of Zanzibar have their own football associations which are associate members of CAF (but not members of FIFA). Mayotte, a French Overseas Territory, Saint Helena, a British Overseas Territory, and Western Sahara, a disputed territory, are not members of CAF or any other football confederation.

Each of the CAF member countries have their own football league systems. The clubs playing in each top-level league compete for the title as the country's club champions, and also for places in next season's CAF club competitions, i.e., the CAF Champions League and the CAF Confederation Cup. Due to promotion and relegation, the clubs playing in the top-level league in many countries are different every season.

The champions of the previous season in each country are listed in bold.

For clubs playing at lower divisions, see the separate articles linked to in the relevant sections.
For clubs belonging to any of the other five continental football confederations of the world, see List of football (soccer) clubs.

Algeria

 Country: 
 Football association: Algerian Football Federation
 Top-level league: Algerian Ligue Professionnelle 1

As of 2022–23 season:

Angola

 Country: 
 Football association: Angolan Football Federation
 Top-level league: Girabola

As of 2021–22 season:

Benin

 Country: 
 Football association: Benin Football Federation
 Top-level league: Benin Premier League

As of 2013–14 season:

Botswana

 Country: 
 Football association: Botswana Football Association
 Top-level league: Botswana Premier League

As of 2022–23 season:

Burkina Faso

 Country: 
 Football association: Burkinabé Football Federation
 Top-level league: Burkinabé Premier League

As of 2021-22 season:

Burundi

 Country: 
 Football association: Football Federation of Burundi
 Top-level league: Burundi Premier League

As of 2013–14 season

Cameroon

 Country: 
 Football association: Cameroonian Football Federation
 Top-level league: Elite One

As of 2013-14 season

Cape Verde

 Country: 
 Football association: Cape Verdean Football Federation
 Top-level league: Cape Verdean football Championships
As of 2013-2014 season

Group A

Group B

Central African Republic

 Country: 
 Football association: Central African Football Federation
 Top-level league: Central African Republic League

As of 2013 season  (2013 season was to have started end of February but was cancelled due to military crisis):

Chad

 Country: 
 Football association: Chadian Football Federation
 Top-level league: Chad Premier League

As of 2013 season:

Comoros

 Country: 
 Football association: Comoros Football Federation
 Top-level league: Comoros Premier League

As of 2013 season

Congo

 Country: 
 Football association: Congolese Football Federation
 Top-level league: Congo Premier League

As of 2013 season

Democratic Republic of the Congo

 Country: 
 Football association: Congolese Association Football Federation
 Top-level league: Linafoot

As of 2013–2014 season

Djibouti

 Country: 
 Football association: Djiboutian Football Federation
 Top-level league: Djibouti Premier League

As of 2015-16 season

Egypt

 Country: 
 Football association: Egyptian Football Association
 Top-level league: Egyptian Premier League

As of 2017–18

Equatorial Guinea

 Country: 
 Football association: Equatoguinean Football Federation
 Top-level league: Equatoguinean Premier League

As of 2014 season

Región Continental

Región Insular

Eritrea

 Country: 
 Football association: Eritrean National Football Federation
 Top-level league: Eritrean Premier League

Eswatini

 Country: 
 Football association: Eswatini Football Association
 Top-level league: Premier League of Eswatini

As of 2013-14 season

Ethiopia

 Country: 
 Football association: Ethiopian Football Federation
 Top-level league: Ethiopian Premier League

As of 2013 season

Gabon

 Country: 
 Football association: Gabonese Football Federation
 Top-level league: Gabon Championnat National D1

As of 2014 season

Gambia

 Country: 
 Football association: Gambia Football Association
 Top-level league: Gambian Championnat National D1

As of 2014 season

Ghana

 Country: 
 Football association: Ghana Football Association
 Top-level league: Ghana Premier League

As of 2013-14 season

Guinea

 Country: 
 Football association: Guinean Football Federation
 Top-level league: Guinée Championnat National

As of 2014 season

Guinea-Bissau

 Country: 
 Football association: Football Federation of Guinea-Bissau
 Top-level league: Campeonato Nacional da Guiné-Bissau

As of 2014 season

Ivory Coast

 Country: 
 Football association: Ivorian Football Federation
 Top-level league: Ligue 1

As of 2013 season

Kenya

 Country: 
 Football association: Football Kenya Federation
 Top-level league: Kenyan Premier League

As of 2014 season

Lesotho

 Country: 
 Football association: Lesotho Football Association
 Top-level league: Lesotho Premier League

As of 2013-14 season

Liberia

 Country: 
 Football association: Liberia Football Association
 Top-level league: Liberian Premier League

As of 2013-14 season

Libya

 Country: 
 Football association: Libyan Football Federation
 Top-level league: Libyan Premier League

As of 2013-14 season

Madagascar

 Country: 
 Football association: Malagasy Football Federation
 Top-level league: THB Champions League

As of 2013-14season, (LIGUE DES CHAMPIONS)

Group A

Group B

Malawi

 Country: 
 Football association: Football Association of Malawi
 Top-level league: Malawi Premiere Division

As of 2013-14 season

Mali

 Country: 
 Football association: Malian Football Federation
 Top-level league: Malien Premiere Division

As of 2013 season

Mauritania

 Country: 
 Football association: Football Federation of the Islamic Republic of Mauritania
 Top-level league: Ligue 1 Mauritania

As of 2013-14 season

Mauritius

 Country: 
 Football association: Mauritius Football Association
 Top-level league: Mauritian League

As of 2013-14 season

Morocco

 Country: 
 Football association: Royal Moroccan Football Federation
 Top-level league: Botola 1

As of 2022-23 season

Mozambique

 Country: 
 Football association: Mozambican Football Federation
 Top-level league: Moçambola

As of 2014 season

Namibia

 Country: 
 Football association: Namibia Football Association
 Top-level league: Namibia Premier Football League[NPFL]

As of 2020/2021 season

Niger

 Country: 
 Football association: Nigerien Football Federation
 Top-level league: Niger Premier League

As of 2014 season:

Nigeria

 Country: 
 Football association: Nigeria Football Federation
 Top-level league: Nigeria Premier League

As of 2014:

Réunion

 Country: 
 Football association: Réunionese Football League
 Top-level league: Réunion Premier League

As of 2013 season:

Rwanda

 Country: 
 Football association: Rwandese Association Football Federation
 Top-level league: Rwandan Premier League

As of 2013-14 season

São Tomé and Príncipe

 Country: 
 Football association: São Toméan Football Federation
 Top-level league: São Tomé and Príncipe Championship

As of 2013-14 season

Senegal

 Country: 
 Football association: Senegalese Football Federation
 Top-level league: Senegal Premier League

As of 2013-14 season

Seychelles

 Country: 
 Football association: Seychelles Football Federation
 Top-level league: Seychelles League

Season 2013

Sierra Leone

 Country: 
 Football association: Sierra Leone Football Association
 Top-level league: Sierra Leone National Premier League

As 2013

Somalia

 Country: 
 Football association: Somali Football Federation
 Top-level league: Somalia League

As of 2013-14 season:

South Africa

 Country: 
 Football association: South African Football Association
 Top-level league: Premier Soccer League

As of 2013

South Sudan

 Country: 
 Football association: South Sudan Football Association
 Top-level league: South Sudan Football Championship

As of 2013

Sudan

 Country: 
 Football association: Sudan Football Association
 Top-level league: Sudan Premier League

As of 2014 season

Tanzania

 Country: 
 Football association: Tanzania Football Federation
 Top-level league: Tanzanian Premier League
As of 2013/2014 season
Ndanda Sports Club

Togo

 Country: 
 Football association: Togolese Football Federation
 Top-level league: Togolese Championnat National

As of 2014 season

Tunisia

 Country: 
 Football association: Tunisian Football Federation
 Top-level league: Tunisian Ligue Professionnelle 1

As of 2013-14 season

Uganda

 Country: 
 Football association: Federation of Uganda Football Associations
 Top-level league: Ugandan Premier League

As of 2013-14 season

Zambia

 Country: 
 Football association: Football Association of Zambia
 Top-level league: Zambian Premier League

As of 2017 season

Zanzibar

 Country: 
 Football association: Zanzibar Football Association
 Top-level league: Zanzibar Premier League

As of 2013 season

Zimbabwe

 Country: 
 Football association: Zimbabwe Football Association
 Top-level league: Zimbabwe Premier Soccer League

As of 2021-22 season:

See also
List of top-division football clubs in AFC countries
List of second division football clubs in AFC countries
List of top-division football clubs in CONCACAF countries
List of top-division football clubs in CONMEBOL countries
List of top-division football clubs in OFC countries
List of top-division football clubs in UEFA countries
List of top-division football clubs in non-FIFA countries
List of second division football clubs in UEFA countries
Domestic football champions

References

The RSSSF Archive – Domestic Results (Africa), Rec.Sport.Soccer Statistics Foundation. Last accessed 30 October 2006.

+CAF
Association football in Africa